Gumieńce is a municipal neighbourhood of the city of Szczecin, Poland situated on the left bank of Oder river, west of the Szczecin Old Town, Middle Town and Pomorzany. As of January 2011 it had a population of 19,120.

The Central Cemetery is located in eastern part of Gumieńce.

Before 1945 when Stettin was a part of Germany, the German name of this suburb was Stettin-Scheune.

References

Neighbourhoods of Szczecin